Franz Simandl (August 1, 1840 – December 15, 1912) was a Czech double-bassist and pedagogue most remembered for his book New Method for the Double Bass, known as the "Simandl book", which is to this day used as a standard study of double bass technique and hand positions.

His approach uses the first, second, and fourth fingers of the left hand (the third and fourth operating together as one digit) for stopping the strings in the lower register of the instrument and divides the fingerboard into various positions.

The second volume of the method looks at the use of thumb position using the thumb, first, second and third fingers, to play solo, high register work and again dividing the fingerboard up into a concept of positions. The second volume also delves extensively into the playing of harmonics.

Simandl's "New Method" of playing, now over a century old, is still common among classical double bassists, although the book itself is slowly being replaced by newer methods which incorporate modern pedagogical theory. Modern adaptations of, extensions to, and challenges to Simandl doctrines are acknowledged.

Simandl studied at the Prague Conservatory with  before becoming the principal bassist in the Vienna Court Opera Orchestra. He was Professor of double-bass at the Vienna Conservatory from 1869 to 1910. His pupils include many of the leading bassists of his time such as Ludwig Manoly, who moved to New York City becoming principal bass of the New York Philharmonic and was an influential teacher.

The Simandl "family tree" of bass pedagogues extends for many generations.  Prominent bassist/educators who can trace their lineage directly back to Simandl include Adolf Mišek, Richard Davis, Mark Dresser, Joseph Guastafeste, Greg Sarchet, Gary Karr, Hermann Reinshagen, Karl E. H. Seigfried, Ludwig Streicher, Bertram Turetzky, and Frederick Zimmermann.

Notes

References
Simandl, Franz (1956). 30 studies for string bass. LCCN 85751475
Simandl, Franz (1957). Gradus ad parnassum : 24 studies for string bass. LCCN 85752065
Simandl, Franz (1968). New method for string bass. LCCN 97706725

External links
 

1840 births
1912 deaths
Czech people of German descent
Classical double-bassists
Prague Conservatory alumni
19th-century classical musicians